A ball washer or ball shagger is a piece of equipment for cleaning dirty golf balls. Because golf balls have a dimpled surface to improve their aerodynamic properties, increasing both distance and control, and are used primarily on grassy surfaces, they tend to collect dirt and grass easily, which can adversely affect their aerodynamic characteristics.  Ball washers are typically found on golf courses; on some courses, there is one at every hole.  To maintain these aerodynamic properties balls are usually inspected for dirt before play, and washed if required.

Ball washers can be operated either manually or electronically. Ball washers for cleaning individual balls consist of a cylindrical housing, in which the ball to be cleaned is inserted. The cleaning of the ball takes place via circulating brushes. For cleaning a larger number of golf balls, machines are used which suck up the balls like a vacuum cleaner, wash them (usually some sort of detergent is used), and put them in a separate net afterward. Then clean balls usually go into Ball Dispenser machine

References

Golf equipment